William Tuckwell (1829–1919), who liked to be known as the "radical parson", was an English Anglican clergyman well known on political platforms for his experiments in allotments, his advocacy of land nationalisation, and his enthusiasm for Christian socialism.  He was an advocate of teaching science in the schools.

Life
Tuckwell was born on 27 November 1829. He was the eldest son of  Margaret, née Wood (1803/4–1842) and William Tuckwell (1784–1845), a surgeon at the Radcliffe Infirmary in Oxford.

Tuckwell was educated at a preparatory school in Hammersmith before attending Winchester College from 1842 and New College, Oxford, in 1848.

From 1857 to 1864 he was headmaster of New College School. In 1864 the Warden of New College, Oxford, nominated him as headmaster of Taunton Grammar School, later known as Taunton College School. It was recorded that his "energy and vitality" increased the size and quality of the school.

In 1858 he married Rosa Strong (b. 1829/30), eldest daughter of Captain Henry Strong, an Indian army officer. Her younger sister was feminist and trade unionist Emilia Dilke. Rosa and William Tuckwell had four children, one son and three daughters. Their second daughter Gertrude Tuckwell  (1861–1951) was a trade unionist, social worker, author, and the first woman magistrate appointed in London.

William Tuckwell died on 1 February 1919. His daughter Gertrude was his executor.

The Reminiscences 
He is best remembered as the author of Reminiscences of Oxford, which records the Oxford of the 1830s, but is somewhat misleading.  Owen Chadwick records that he liked to "pretend to be much older than he was. ... What Tuckwell knew about were the fifties and sixties, and his portrait of Tractarian leaders is drawn from experiences in that later time; though quite often he likes to give the impression that it is much earlier."

His daughter was Gertrude Tuckwell, to whom his Reminiscences of a Radical Parson was dedicated.

Christian socialism 
Tuckwell became active in politics in February 1884, at the time of the great reform bill.  His work among the poor had led him to enquire much about their conditions and lives.

Over the next ten years he delivered more than a thousand speeches in support of Christian socialism and in favour of a redistribution of wealth and land.

Bibliography 
 William Tuckwell, A. W. Kinglake: A Biographical and Literary Study
 William Tuckwell, The Ancient Ways: Winchester 50 Years Ago
 William Tuckwell, Horace, 1905. Google books edition
 William Tuckwell, Tongues in Trees and Sermons in Stones, 1891. Google books edition
 William Tuckwell, Reminiscences of a Radical Parson, 1905. Google books edition
 William Tuckwell, Reminiscences of Oxford, London: Cassell, 1901, expanded 2nd ed. 1908.  Google books edition of 1908 edition
 William Tuckwell, Pre-tractarian Oxford: A Reminiscence of the Oriel 'Noetics'''
 William Tuckwell, The New Utopia or England in 1985: A Lecture, 1885.
 William Tuckwell, Christian Socialism and Other Lectures, 1891.
 TUCKWELL, W. Science-Teaching in Schools. Nature'' 1, 18–20 (1869). https://doi.org/10.1038/001018d0

See also 
 Liberal Party (UK)

References

External links 

 
 

1829 births
1919 deaths
19th-century English Anglican priests
19th-century English non-fiction writers
20th-century English Anglican priests
20th-century English non-fiction writers
Anglican socialists
Anglican writers
British Christian writers
English Christian socialists
English male non-fiction writers
English religious writers
Heads of schools in England
People educated at Winchester College